Geodia nodastrella is a species of sponge in the family Geodiidae. It is found in the waters of the North Atlantic Ocean. The species was first described by Henry John Carter in 1876.

Bibliography 
 Carter, H.J. (1876). Descriptions and Figures of Deep-Sea Sponges and their Spicules, from the Atlantic Ocean, dredged up on board H.M.S.‘Porcupine’, chiefly in 1869 (concluded). Annals and Magazine of Natural History. (4) 18(105): 226-240; (106): 307-324; (107): 388-410;(108): 458-479, pls XII-XVI, page(s): 400-401

References

Tetractinellida
Animals described in 1876
Taxa named by Henry John Carter